FC Skonto/Cerība-46.vsk., or Skonto Cerība, is a Latvian women's football club from Riga. It was founded in 2004 as SK Cerība-46.vsk. It took its current name after it was absorbed by Skonto FC in 2007, becoming its women's team. It has won five national championships since its debut in 2004. They played the UEFA Champions League for the first time in the 2012-13 season.

Titles
 Latvian League (5)
 2004, 2006, 2008, 2009, 2011

Other results

UEFA competition record

2012-13 squad

References

Skonto FC
Football clubs in Riga
Association football clubs established in 2004
Women's football clubs in Latvia
2004 establishments in Latvia